25 Degrees in Winter is a 2004 international comedy-drama film directed by Stéphane Vuillet.

Cast 
 Carmen Maura - Abuelita
 Jacques Gamblin - Miguel
 Ingeborga Dapkūnaitė - Sonia
 Raphaëlle Molinier - Laura
 Pedro Romero - Juan
 Lubna Azabal - Loubna
 Valérie Lemaître - Estelle
 Aleksandr Medvedev - Evgenij

References

External links 

2004 films
2004 comedy-drama films
Russian comedy-drama films
French comedy-drama films
Belgian comedy-drama films
Spanish comedy-drama films
2000s French films